Yusuf Abubakar Yusuf (born 5 November 1956) is a Nigerian politician who has been the APC Member of the Senate for the constituency of Taraba Central since 2015. He was declared the winner of the seat in the Senate on 26 November 2015 after an election tribunal, and then followed by an Appeal Court declaration, following the Nigerian general election, 2015. PDP candidate Bashir Marafa had previously been declared the winner of the seat, but was replaced by Yusuf Abubakar Yusuf when the tribunal found there to have been electoral inconsistencies.

Early life and education
Born in Nguroje, he schooled at Ahmadu Bello University (BSc Economics, 1980) and the University of East Anglia (MA Economics, 1983). He was a faculty member at the University of Maiduguri.

References

1956 births
Living people
Ahmadu Bello University alumni
Alumni of the University of East Anglia
Members of the Senate (Nigeria)
All Progressives Congress politicians
Academic staff of the University of Maiduguri
People from Taraba State